is a monorail train station on the Shōnan Monorail Enoshima Line located in Kamakura, Kanagawa Prefecture, Japan. It is located 2.6 kilometers from the northern terminus of the Shōnan Monorail Enoshima Line at Ōfuna Station.

History
Shōnan-Fukasawa Station was opened on March 7, 1970 with the opening of the Enoshima Line.

Lines
Shōnan Monorail Company Ltd
Enoshima Line

Station layout
Shōnan-Fukasawa Station is an elevated station with a single island platform serving two tracks. The station is unattended.

Adjacent stations

External links
Shonan Monorail home page 

Railway stations in Kanagawa Prefecture
Railway stations in Japan opened in 1970
Shonan Monorail Enoshima Line
Buildings and structures in Kamakura, Kanagawa